Rear Admiral Mohammad Sohail (TAS), NUP, PPM, psc, BN is a two-star admiral in Bangladesh Navy who is currently serving as Chairman of Payra Port Authority. Before that, he was serving as the Director of Submarine at the Navy Headquarters. He also served as Director of Naval Intelligence and commanded BNS Haji Mohshin while he was Commodore.

Early life and education 
Mohammad Sohail joined joined Bangladesh Naval Academy on 1986 and On 1 January 1988, he was commissioned in the Executive branch.

Military career 
Sohail was faculty of Defence Services Command and Staff College, Mirpur. Then served as Colonel GS in the Counter Terrorism and Intelligence Bureau (CTIB) and the Internal Affairs Bureau (IAB) at DGFI. Besides his military career he also appointed in Home Ministry at Rapid Action Battalion. He served as the Legal and Media Wing Director of the Elite Force. He got promoted to Rear Admiral from Commodore on 22 february, 2022. Since then he deputed at Ministry of Commerce. He supposed to retire on 31 December, 2023.

References 

Living people
Bangladesh Navy personnel
Bangladeshi Navy admirals
Year of birth missing (living people)